County Road 183 or County Route 183 may refer to:
County Road 183 (Walton County, Florida), formerly State Road 183
County Road 183 (Pinellas County, Florida), along the Gulf of Mexico south of Clearwater Beach
County Route 183 (Erie County, New York)
County Route 183 (Herkimer County, New York)
County Route 183 (Onondaga County, New York)
County Route 183 (Sullivan County, New York)